Porter Landing is a locality and former boom town at the foot of Dease Lake, British Columbia, Canada, in that province's far Northern Interior.

References

Cassiar Country
Unincorporated settlements in British Columbia
Ghost towns in British Columbia